Julio Cesar Mendoza Loor is an Ecuadorian dressage rider. He competed at the 2018 World Equestrian Games in Tryon, North Carolina as the first Ecuadorian dressage rider. He competed also at the 2011 Pan American Games and the 2015 Pan-American Games. He won individual and team gold during the Bolivarian Games in 2017 and 2022.

Since 2007, Mendoza Loor lives in Tryon, North Carolina, United States of America.

References 

Living people
1979 births
Ecuadorian male equestrians
Ecuadorean dressage riders
Equestrians at the 2011 Pan American Games
Equestrians at the 2015 Pan American Games
Pan American Games competitors for Ecuador
21st-century Ecuadorian people